This page features lists of species and organisms that have become extinct. The reasons for extinction range from natural occurrences, such as shifts in the Earth's ecosystem or natural disasters, to human influences on nature by the overuse of natural resources, hunting and destruction of natural habitats.

In actual theoretical practice, a species not definitely located in the wild in the last 50 years of current time is textually called "extinct".

Plants
 List of recently extinct plants

Animals

By region

 List of African animals extinct in the Holocene
 List of Madagascar and Indian Ocean Island animals extinct in the Holocene
 List of Macaronesian animals extinct in the Holocene
 List of Saint Helena, Ascension and Tristan da Cunha animals extinct in the Holocene
 List of Asian animals extinct in the Holocene
 List of extinct animals of India
 List of extinct animals of the Philippines
 List of European animals extinct in the Holocene
 List of extinct animals of Catalonia
 List of Caucasian animals extinct in the Holocene
 List of extinct animals of the British Isles
 Extinct animals from the Isle of Man
 List of extinct and endangered species of Italy
 List of extinct and endangered species of Lithuania
 List of extinct animals of the Netherlands
 List of extinct animals of the Nordics
 List of extinct animals of Romania
 List of North American animals extinct in the Holocene
 List of Antillian and Bermudan animals extinct in the Holocene 
 List of extinct animals of Martinique and Guadeloupe
 List of Oceanian animals extinct in the Holocene
 List of Australia-New Guinea species extinct in the Holocene
 List of Hawaiian animals extinct in the Holocene
 List of New Zealand species extinct in the Holocene
 List of South American animals extinct in the Holocene

By taxon
 List of recently extinct amphibians
 List of extinct bird species since 1500
 List of bird extinctions by year
 List of recently extinct fishes
 List of recently extinct invertebrates
 List of recently extinct arthropods
 List of extinct arachnids
 List of recently extinct insects
 List of extinct butterflies
 List of recently extinct mammals
 List of extinct dog breeds
 List of extinct cetaceans
 List of recently extinct molluscs
 List of recently extinct reptiles

Fossil taxa
 List of dinosaur genera
 List of fossil bird genera
 List of Late Quaternary prehistoric bird species
 List of fossil primates
 Lists of prehistoric fish

Recent extinction
 List of bird extinctions by year
 List of extinct dog breeds
 List of recently extinct amphibians
 List of recently extinct arthropods
 List of recently extinct fishes
 List of recently extinct insects
 List of recently extinct invertebrates
 List of recently extinct mammals
 List of recently extinct molluscs
 List of recently extinct reptiles

See also

 :Category:Extinct species
 :Category:Species made extinct by human activities
 :Category:Endangered species by reason they are threatened
 Extinction
 Extinction event
 Endangered species
 Extinct (disambiguation)
 Lists of organisms by population
 Lists of animals